Ram Buttri Road or Soi Ram Buttri (also written as Rambuttri), is a small road, or soi (ซอย; alley), in Bangkok, Thailand. It is situated near Khaosan Road in the Bang Lamphu neighbourhood in the Phra Nakhon district. The road mainly consists of two parts. The first part connects Sip Sam Hang Road with the Chakrabongse Road. The second part runs from the Chakrabongse Road, beside Wat Chana Songkhram, to the Chao Fa Road, which is at the foot of the Pra Pin-Klao Bridge opposite the National Theater.

The name, Ram Buttri, translates as 'daughter of Rama'. It refers to Mom Chao Ying Pao Suriyakul, who was the daughter of Prince Rama Isares. She donated money to build a bridge dedicated to her father, which crossed Khlong Bang Lamphu (Bang Lamphu canal), also known as Khlong Ban Khaek (Ban Khaek canal). Thus the bridge was named "Saphan Ram Buttri", and the canal was called Khlong Ram Buttri. The official opening ceremony was held on August 13, 1910, presided over by King Chulalongkorn (Rama V). Later, the canal was turned into a road, and the bridge was demolished, but its name remained.

Today, Ram Buttri Road is home to hostels, guest houses, boutique hotels, bars, Thai massage services, 24 hour restaurants, and many street food stalls, which are well known among tourists. The Songkran festival usually takes place from April 13th to April 15th every year and makes the Khaosan Road one of the busiest places in Bangkok.

Moreover, one lane of the road that runs out to Chao Fa Road has a name called "Trok Rong Mai" (ตรอกโรงไหม), translates as 'silk factory lane', because during the early Ratanakosin period, there were two royal silk-weaving factories: one close to Saphan Chang Rong Si (near Ministry of Interior and Ministry of Defense headquarters in present), and the other close to the Front Palace. The royal silk-weaving-factory located near the Saphan Chang Rong Si dissolved in the reign of King Nangklao (Rama III), remaining only another factory. It was the place to produce silk, used for the clothes of the monarch and royal family, as well as the senior civil servants. Until the reign of King Chulalongkorn, the operation was closed down due to more fabric orders from other countries. The canal that runs through this area was also called Khlong Rong Mai. Alike to Saphan Ram Buttri and Khlong Ram Buttri, although the factory and canal have disappeared, the name "Trok Rong Mai" is still used for this area. At present, it is the location of many guesthouses for tourists as well as Ram Buttri Road nearby.

Transportation
BMTA bus: route A4, 2, 3, 6, 15, 30, 32, 33, 43, 53, 56, 64, 65, 68, 127, 516, 524

References

External links

Streets in Bangkok
Neighbourhoods of Bangkok
Tourist attractions in Bangkok
Shopping districts and streets in Thailand
Phra Nakhon district